Union Township is a township in Plymouth County, Iowa in the United States. The township is named after.

The elevation of Union Township is listed as 1368 feet above mean sea level.

References

Townships in Iowa